Taraia Robin (born 30 August 1982) is a New Zealand cricketer. He played three first-class and one List A matches between 1999 and 2001. He was also part of New Zealand's squad for the 2000 Under-19 Cricket World Cup.

References

External links
 

1982 births
Living people
New Zealand cricketers
Central Districts cricketers
Cricketers from Hastings, New Zealand